La falena is a 1916 silent Italian drama film directed by Carmine Gallone. The film is considered to be lost, with only a fragment surviving in the film archive of the Cineteca Italiana.

Plot
Thea (Borelli) is a sculptor diagnosed with phthisis before she marries Filippo (Habay). After abandoning him, her health begins to decline. She organises a final party, inviting her estranged husband. He fails to show, as he's now married to another woman. Thea appears naked in front of her guests before she kills herself.

Cast
 Lyda Borelli as Thea di Marlievo
 Andrea Habay as Filippo
 Francesco Cacace as Lignères
 Giulia Cassini-Rizzotto as Principessa Maria
 Nella Montagna as La madre di Thea
 Lina Dax as Allegra
 Alfonso Cassini as Il maestro di Thea

References

External links
 

1916 films
1916 drama films
Italian silent feature films
Italian black-and-white films
Italian films based on plays
Italian drama films
Films directed by Carmine Gallone
Lost Italian films
Silent drama films